Peter A. Clavelle (born May 10, 1949) is an American politician who served as the 38th and 40th mayor of Burlington, Vermont, and was the first member of a third party to hold the office since James Edmund Burke in 1935. Bernie Sanders also won several elections as an independent candidate in the 1980s (e.g. in 1981, in 1983, in 1985, in 1987), defeating both Republican and Democratic candidates. Sanders and Clavelle founded the Vermont Progressive Party during Sanders' time as mayor.

Early life and education
Peter A. Clavelle was born on May 10, 1949, to Raymond and Eleanor Clavelle in Winooski, Vermont. He earned a Bachelor of Arts degree in urban studies from Saint Anselm College and a Master of Public Administration from the Maxwell School of Citizenship and Public Affairs at Syracuse University.

Career 
In 1961, he was elected mayor of Winooski for a day by his Boy Scout troop. In 1972 he was appointed as Castleton's town manager and in 1976 was appointed as Winooski's city manager. During Bernie Sanders' tenure as mayor of Burlington, Clavelle served as Burlington's personnel director and later as director of the Community and Economic Development Office from 1983 to 1989.

1989–1993 mayoral terms 

Clavelle was elected mayor in 1989 as a Progressive. During the 1993 mayoral election he raised almost twice as much money as his Republican opponent Peter C. Brownell although Brownell was able to take the Burlington police union's endorsement from Clavell. On March 3 Brownell unexpectedly defeated Clavelle with 5,410 votes to 4,686 votes. Clavelle stated that he lost due to the controversy over his proposal (which was passed) to have the city pay for healthcare benefits for domestic partners of city workers.

1995–2006 mayoral terms 

Clavelle returned to the mayor's office two years later in 1995, after defeating Burlington's 39th Mayor Peter Brownell. 

In 2004, Clavelle ran for Governor of Vermont as a Democrat against incumbent Governor Jim Douglas and four other candidates. In order to run in the Democratic Party primary, Clavelle had to change party affiliation, as required by state law. He received the endorsement of five-term former Democratic Governor Howard Dean, but was defeated, 38% to 59%.  After Burlington's switch to instant-runoff voting in 2005, Clavelle decided not to run in the 2006 election.

Clavelle did not seek re-election to an eighth term as mayor in the 2006 Burlington mayoral election.  Bob Kiss succeeded Clavelle as mayor in April 2006.

In 2012, Clavelle moved to Albania as a staff member on a USAID-funded local governance project. He returned to Vermont in 2016.

See also 
 2004 Vermont gubernatorial election
 List of elected socialist mayors in the United States

References 

|-

|-

|-

1949 births
American socialists
Living people
Maxwell School of Citizenship and Public Affairs alumni
Mayors of Burlington, Vermont
People from Winooski, Vermont
Saint Anselm College alumni
Vermont Democrats
Vermont Progressive Party politicians
Vermont socialists